Logan-Cache Airport  is an airport in the western United States in Cache County, Utah, located  northwest of Logan. It is owned under the Logan-Cache Airport Authority, formed by Inter-local Agreement between Cache County and Logan City in 1992.  This organization is subsidized by the city and county, having no authority to tax or bond for additional funding. Revenues are derived from leases of land, buildings, fuel and maintenance fees. The airport was previously owned by Cache County and managed by county commissioners.

History & services
Western Airlines served Logan from 1946 until West Coast Airlines replaced them in 1959; West Coast pulled out in 1964. Key Airlines served the airport from Salt Lake City from 1964 to 1976. In that year, Utah carrier Transwestern Airlines had its company headquartered at the airport, with flights to their hub at Salt Lake City, until its acquisition by Horizon Air in December 1983.

Currently, scheduled services come from Ameriflight and Gem Air under contract for UPS and FedEx Express, transporting from several nearby states. Frequent charter flights occur on behalf of Utah State University's athletic teams and their opponents. Utah State also occupies several hangars on the north end of the airport access road for its fixed-wing and rotorcraft training programs, and operates the dispatch office in the main passenger terminal. The airport also hosts Leading Edge Aviation, which offers flight training, FBO services, and a pilot supply shop. There are also several independent CFIs based at the airport.

Facilities 
 17/35:  Asphalt
 10/28:  Asphalt
 Two non-operational control towers

This airport remains a Class G, uncontrolled airport, with Class E airspace beginning at 700 ft AGL.

Incidents & Accidents
January 9, 2005: A Grumman Gulfstream II operated by the Icon Health and Fitness, registered N74RQ, impacted a snow bank during a final approach after the pilot had failed to conduct a proper IFR operation, after arriving from Charles B. Wheeler Downtown Airport, in Kansas City, Missouri. The plane had 2 crew and 7 passengers. No one was killed or injured.
February 2, 2013: A Cessna 175 Skylark that had taken off from this airport had to make an emergency landing in a nearby field due to carburetor ice.
July 18, 2016: a Diamond DA40 operated by Utah State University, registered as N419FP, was destroyed in Paradise during a training flight from the airport, with one fatality. The student pilot killed exceeded the critical angle of attack, and resulted in a flat spin stall. This became the first fatal crash in the USU Aviation Program and the first plane crash in its history.
June 24,2022: A Cessna 152, registered N934JH, owned by USU, crashed near Mendon, Utah. Neither the student nor the instructor aboard survived.

References

External links 

 

Airports in Utah
Buildings and structures in Logan, Utah
Transportation in Cache County, Utah